Tancaite-(Ce) is a very rare molybdate mineral with the formula FeCe(MoO4)3•3H2O. It was found in Punta de Su Seinargiu locality on Sardinia, Italy. Red crystals of tancaite-(Ce) resemble modified cubes, but the mineral is trigonal (space group R-3). The type locality of tancaite-(Ce) is also a place of discovery of other molybdate minerals, including thorium molybdates ichnusaite and nuragheite.

References

Molybdate minerals
Cerium minerals
Iron minerals
Trigonal minerals
Minerals in space group 148
Minerals described in 2020